Joana de Eça (1480-1572) was a Portuguese courtier and royal favorite. She served as camareira-mor (Mistress of the Robes) to Catherine of Austria, Queen of Portugal.

She was born to João Fogaça and D. Maria de Eça and married Pedro Gonçalves da Câmara. She served as principal lady-in-waiting to queen regent Catherine, and were reputed to have had influence over the affairs of state as a royal favorite during the minor regency of Sebastian of Portugal, which made her a controversial public figure.

References 
 Manuel Abranches de Soveral, Ascendências Visienses. Ensaio genealógico sobre a nobreza de Viseu. Séculos XIV a XVII, Porto 2004, .

1480 births
1572 deaths
16th-century Portuguese people
Portuguese ladies-in-waiting
Royal favourites